is a Japanese light novel series written by Makiko Nagaoka and illustrated by Magako. The series began publication under Fujimi Shobo's Fujimi Fantasia Bunko imprint in September 2020. A manga adaptation by Noyama Carpaccio began serialization in Square Enix's Gangan Online web service in February 2022. An anime television series adaptation by ENGI is set to premiere in 2023.

Premise
As a punishment for losing a game, Ryūto Kashima, a gloomy high school boy, is forced to confess to Runa Shirakawa, a girl who is at the top of the school caste and is admired by everyone. They end up going out simply because Runa is currently "available". Furthermore, Runa later brings Ryūto, whom she has just started dating, to her room as a matter of course. Both of them are different in just about everything, friends to hang out with or ways to enjoy themselves. Nevertheless, they are surprised by their differences everyday, accepting it, and gradually connect with each other.

Characters

An ordinary second-year high school boy. He is a gloomy person, does not have many friends, and his only hobby is watching live streams on the Internet. As a punishment for losing a game, he confesses to Runa Shirakawa, a girl who is admired by everyone and whom he never talks to. She accepts his confession and they end up going out together.

A gyaru who is at the top of the school caste and is considered to be the most beautiful girl in her grade. She is bright, cheerful, can approach anyone without hesitation, and has dated many boys before. After Ryūto confesses to her, she accepts his confession and starts going out with him. Even though she has experience in dating, she still worries that their relationship might not last long.

Ryūto's first crush and Runa's fraternal twin sister, but they live separately due to certain circumstances. She transfers to their school and later becomes interested in Ryūto.

Media

Light novels
Written by Makiko Nagaoka with illustrations by Magako, the series began publication under Fujimi Shobo's Fujimi Fantasia Bunko imprint on September 19, 2020. A promotional video was released on Kadokawa's official YouTube channel on July 15, 2021 to promote the series, featuring Momo Asakura as Runa Shirakawa. Six volumes have been published as of March 2023.

Manga
A manga adaptation illustrated by Noyama Carpaccio began serialization in Square Enix's Gangan Online web service on February 23, 2022. As of November 2022, two tankōbon volumes have been released.

Anime
On September 9, 2022, an anime television series adaptation was announced. The anime is produced by ENGI and directed by Hideaki Ōba, with Hiroko Fukuda overseeing series' scripts, Yosuke Itō designing the characters, and Kei Haneoka composing the music. It is set to premiere in 2023.

References

External links
 
 
 

2020 Japanese novels
Anime and manga based on light novels
ENGI
Fujimi Fantasia Bunko
Gangan Online manga
Gyaru in fiction
Japanese webcomics
Light novels
Romantic comedy anime and manga
Shōnen manga
Upcoming anime television series